The 1911–12 Scottish Division One season was won by Rangers by six points over nearest rival Celtic.

League table

Results

References

Scottish Football Archive

1911–12 Scottish Football League
Scottish Division One seasons
Scottish